IBM Storyboard Plus was a graphic editing suite published by IBM in 1990. Storyboard Plus was withdrawn from sale April 1993.

It consisted of a number of programs that were integrated:
 Picture Maker (a graphic editor) 
 Picture Taker (a screenshot capture program) 
 Story Editor (for building interactive animated "stories"), 
 Story Teller (for presenting the stories),

References
 Probert Encyclopedia

Presentation software
Technical communication tools
DOS software